The Twenty-Twenty Corporation is a nonprofit organization based in Baltimore, Maryland. The organization serves the youth residing in the Baltimore-Washington Metropolitan Area. The organization focuses its efforts on its two primary youth-centered missions: positive recreational opportunities and educational enhancement and support.

History 
The organization was founded in December 2005. It received its 501(c)(3) exemption in January 2006.

The organization's first year of business solely entailed recreational activities for the area youth. In January 2007 The Twenty-Twenty Corporation joined the Maryland Association of Nonprofit Organizations (MD Nonprofits).

Organization 
The Twenty-Twenty Corporation is organized into five divisions of appointed staff and two elected offices, the Office of the President and the Board of Trustees.

The Office of the President includes the President/Chief Executive Officer, the Public Policy Liaison, the Secretary and the Chairman of the Board of Trustees (who also serves on the Board of Trustees). With the exception of the Chairman of the Board of Trustees, none of the elected officials have voting powers.

The Board of Trustees has nine elected officials. Trustees are elected by the Corporate Members.

Members of the Corporation are divided into two categories: Corporate Members and Members. Corporate Members are those donors in the top 75th percentile, based on accumulated donations and who have a vested interest in the organization. Corporate members are allowed to participate in nominations and elections, present and organize events (with Corporate endorsements), participate on special committees, represent the Corporation at certain events (with Presidential endorsements) and authorize/sponsor the participation of any otherwise unqualified individual in any Corporate program. Members are the participants, in general, of the organization's programs. Members do not have voting or sponsoring power, but are recognized as regular participants in programs and are entitled to preferential access to such programs.

Recreational opportunities 
Originally, the Corporation's mission was solely to provide positive activities for area youth to have the opportunity to engage in. The founder's premise was that time spent enjoying the events offered by the organization would be well invested in positive activities and not in negative and delinquent behavior. Thus, the backbone of The Twenty-Twenty Corporation's operations focuses on providing recreational activities to the youth.

Many of the activities are organized based on inquiries and requests from the youth consensus. All activities are offered at no cost to the attendees.

Educational enhancement and support 
The organization manages a tutoring program which focuses on educational support. The STRIKE (Supplemental Training Remedies and Individual Knowledge Enhancement) Program is designed to provide free, effective tutoring services to the membership base served. Since its inception the tutoring services have been provided at no cost to the student. Students must be enrolled in a primary or secondary school in the Baltimore-Washington Metropolitan Area and their performance should be deemed to be in need of assistance by the board of trustees. Tutors evaluate the needs of the students and organize tutoring sessions to accommodate the student's academic needs, the guardian's transportation capabilities and the organization's capacity to provide quality services to a number of students.

The STRIKE Program's Goals and Vision

The Twenty-Twenty Corporation's investment is in the early education and empowerment of the Baltimore-Washington community. The organization seeks to deter the desire to drop out of school, increase the students' understanding of each subject matter, inculcate the seriousness of a basic secondary education in the student and encourage college as a continuation of education.

Tutors offer one-on-one attention to the student to help supplement the concepts learned in school. Many people utilize tutoring services to brush up on concepts that they may have forgotten over time, to better understand concepts that they find to be more difficult than others, or to help prepare themselves for an important exam that is forthcoming.

Other missions 
The Greatest Gift Program is an incentive for area youth to receive a gift for any occasion at no cost to them. Youth are required to have attended at least two of the Corporation's events, complete a short application and a 500 word essay on a pre-selected topic. Youth compete with others who submit an application during the same time period.

Metro Volunteers provides local philanthropic organizations with a pool of qualified volunteers for a number of tasks. The Corporation lends out its volunteers to its partner organizations to help supplement their missions.

References

 Maryland Association of Nonprofit Organizations, Membership List, 2006
 GuideStar.com, 2007

External links 
 Maryland Nonprofits
 Pennsylvanie Avenue Baptist Church
 The Twenty-Twenty Corporation

Charities based in Maryland
Youth organizations based in Maryland
Social welfare charities based in the United States